Chotěšov is a municipality and village in Plzeň-South District in the Plzeň Region of the Czech Republic. It has about 2,900 inhabitants.

Administrative parts

Villages of Hoříkovice, Losina, Mantov and Týnec are administrative parts of Chotěšov.

Geography
It lies mostly in the Plasy Uplands. The southernmost part of the municipal territory lies in the Švihov Highlands and includes the highest point of Chotěšov, the hill Křížový vrch with an altitude of  The Radbuza River flows through the municipality. There are several ponds, the largest of them is Velký.

History
The first written mention of Chotěšov is from 1115. History of the village was connected with the Chotěšov Abbey, which was founded in 1202–1210. In 1822, the estate was bought by Karl Alexander of Thurn and Taxis. His family owned Chotěšov until 1925, and the monastery complex until 1945.

Sights
Chotěšov is known for the Chotěšov Abbey. The current building of the convent dates from 1756 and was built by Jakub Auguston. Today the monastery is open to the public.

On Křížový vrch Hill there is a former church from the mid-19th century with a tower from 1931.

Notable people
Martin Krippner (1817–1894), Austrian military officer

References

External links

Villages in Plzeň-South District